Kami is a Nupoid language spoken in Niger State, Nigeria. Kami is spoken only in Ebo town, located to the south of Lapai. There are at most 500 speakers. Kami is closely related to Gupa and Dibo.

There is also a fishing group known as Kede (Kyadya, Kiadia, Kyedye) who speak the same language.

References

Nupoid languages